Ben Turjeman (born 9 January 1989) is an Israeli footballer who plays for Hakoah Amidar Ramat Gan as a left defender.

Honours

Club
Hapoel Be'er Sheva
Israeli Premier League: 2015–16, 2016-17
Israel Super Cup: 2016
Toto Cup: 2016–17

External links
 

1989 births
Israeli Jews
Living people
Israeli footballers
Footballers from Nof HaGalil
Hapoel Nof HaGalil F.C. players
Hapoel Be'er Sheva F.C. players
Hapoel Acre F.C. players
Hapoel Petah Tikva F.C. players
Bnei Yehuda Tel Aviv F.C. players
Maccabi Netanya F.C. players
Bnei Sakhnin F.C. players
Hapoel Ashdod F.C. players
F.C. Ramla players
Maccabi Ironi Amishav Petah Tikva F.C. players
Hakoah Maccabi Amidar Ramat Gan F.C. players
Hapoel Ashkelon F.C. players
Liga Leumit players
Israeli Premier League players
Israeli people of Moroccan-Jewish descent
Association football defenders